Ninoska Souto-Garcia (born 3 December 1968) is a Spanish former professional tennis player.

Souto comes from the Galicia region of Spain and is of Venezuelan descent. Her sister, Janet Souto, also played on the professional tour. 

As a professional player, Souto reached a best singles ranking of 254 and was ranked as high as 154 in doubles. Her main draw appearances on the WTA Tour all came in doubles, which includes making the semi-finals of the 1988 Spanish Open, partnering sister Janet.

Souto married Spanish footballer Xavier Escaich in 1992.

ITF finals

Singles: 1 (1–0)

Doubles: 9 (6–3)

References

External links
 
 

1968 births
Living people
Spanish female tennis players
Spanish people of Venezuelan descent
Sportspeople of Venezuelan descent
Sportspeople from Galicia (Spain)